Regenerative Satellite Mesh – A (RSM-A) is an internationally standardized satellite communications protocol by Telecommunications Industry Association and European Telecommunications Standards Institute.

It is based upon the Spaceway Ka-band communications system developed by Hughes Network Systems. It is expected to be utilized by the Hughes Network Systems satellite called Spaceway-3.

The standard is meant to provide broadband capabilities of up to 512 kbit/s, 2 Mbit/s, and 16 Mbit/s uplink data communication rates with fixed Ka-band satellite terminal antennas sized as small as 77 cm.  

The standard consists of the following documents:
 TIA-1040.1.01 Physical Layer Specification; Part 1: General Description
 TIA-1040.1.02 Physical Layer Specification; Part 2: Frame Structure
 TIA-1040.1.03 Physical Layer Specification; Part 3: Channel Coding
 TIA-1040.1.04 Physical Layer Specification; Part 4: Modulation
 TIA-1040.1.05 Physical Layer Specification; Part 5: Radio Transmission and Reception
 TIA-1040.1.06 Physical Layer Specification; Part 6: Radio Link Control
 TIA-1040.1.07 Physical Layer Specification; Part 7: Synchronization
 TIA-1040.2.01 MAC/SLC Layer Specification; Part 1: General Description
 TIA-1040.2.02 MAC/SLC Layer Specification; Part 2: SLC Layer
 TIA-1040.2.03 MAC/SLC Layer Specification; Part 3: ST-SAM interface

General Description 
The standard describes the various segments involved in a RSM-A satellite system including:
 Satellite Terminal: fixed satellite terminal for satellite communication linked to terrestrial hosts via connected LANs
 Satellite Payload: geosynchronous regenerative satellite payload and antennas
 Network Operations Control Center: involved ground network management and resource management

The uplink consists of a multi-frequency time-division multiple access (MF-TDMA) scheme where individual uplink spotbeams are assigned frequency channels out of the satellites frequency band. Satellite Terminals transmit on timeslots on its uplink beam's frequency channels using mechanisms such as Bandwidth-on-Demand (BoD) protocols with the satellite payload.

The downlink consists of a time-division multiplexing (TDM) carrier bursts directed in a hoping fashion to different downlink beams each downlink frame timeslot. The downlink beams can be narrow downlink spotbeams during the point-to-point transmission part of each downlink frame or they can be downlink shaped beams that cover a much larger geographic area during the shaped beam transmission part of each downlink frame.

See also 
 List of broadcast satellites

Satellite Internet access
Network protocols